was a prolific Japanese opera composer.

Life and career
Born in Tokyo, she studied at the Tokyo National University of Fine Arts and Music with Tomojiro Ikenouchi, graduating in 1957. She subsequently went to France where she studied with Henri Dutilleux and Alexander Tcherepnin. After that she returned to Japan to teach at the Osaka University of Music.

Between 1978 and 1999 she wrote 18 operas, many of them performed in Tokyo by the Nihon Opera Kyokai or the Nikikai Opera. One work was performed in Italy. In general, she has preferred Japanese subjects; exceptions include her second opera  about Sherlock Holmes and an opera based on Dostoevsky's Crime and Punishment written for a large-scale production at the New National Theatre, Tokyo in 1999.

She died of heart failure on 30 November 2014.

Operas
 The Case-book of Sherlock Holmes (Confession) after Conan Doyle (1981)
 Iwai Uta ga Nagareru Yoruni (1984)
 Shita wo Kamikitta Onna (1986)
 Sute Hime (1989)
 Yosakoi Bushi (1990)
 Petro Kibe (1991)
 Tsumi to batsu (Crime and Punishment) after Dostoevsky (1999)

Other works
Sonatine for piano (1957)
Preludio, aria e toccata for guitar (1970)

Recordings
Yosakoi Bushi has been recorded and published on Laserdisc.

References

Sources
Holledge, Simon. "Hara Kazuko: Crime and Punishment, 19th June 1999", Opera Japonica 

Biographical note for Daniel Quinn recital, accessed 20 January 2010

1935 births
2014 deaths
20th-century classical composers
20th-century Japanese composers
20th-century women composers
21st-century classical composers
21st-century Japanese musicians
21st-century women composers
Japanese classical composers
Japanese women classical composers
Japanese opera composers
Pupils of Henri Dutilleux
Tokyo University of the Arts alumni
Women opera composers